Ignite Institute is a STEAM fields high school located in Erlanger, Kentucky and is the first STEAM-focused high school in Kentucky specializing in Science, Technology, Engineering, Arts and Mathematics.

History

The school site was donated by Toyota as a parting gift to the community of Erlanger as they have now moved to Texas. Toyota wanted to leave something meaningful to the community and though nothing better than a school. Their only requirement was that the school that inhabited their former building would specifically train students to enter fields where employees were needed in the Northern Kentucky area. Ignite agreed and established internal colleges relating to these fields such as Allied Health, Biomedical Sciences, Design, Education, Engineering, and Logistics; all cornerstones of the NKY workforce. The site was officially a former laboratory of Toyota which had closed its last site in 2014, the school is now fully managed and operated by the Boone County government.

Sports

VEX Robotics

On May 7th, 2022 Ignite's VEX Robotics team won the World Championships in Dallas, Texas. Out of 20,000 registered teams, only 818 from 40 countries were selected for the world competition. The IGNITE robotics team went 10-0 in round-robin qualification matches. They then went on to win the quarterfinal and semifinal to get to the best-of-three division final. They lost the first match, but came back to win the second match and the third match to earn a spot in the grand elimination bracket of all 10 division winners. They again won their quarterfinal and semifinal matches taking them to the best of three final to crown the world champion. The grand elimination was held in a 10,000 seat-domed arena where the crowd cheered on the IGNITE team to win.

References

External links
 Ignite Institute Home Page
 Ignite Institute Video Feature on Fox 19

Schools in Boone County, Kentucky
Schools in Kenton County, Kentucky
Educational institutions established in 2019
2019 establishments in Kentucky